Cirencester Park is a country house in the parish of Cirencester in Gloucestershire, England, and is the seat of the Bathurst family, Earls Bathurst. It is a Grade II* listed building. The gardens are Grade I listed on the Register of Historic Parks and Gardens.

History 
Allen Bathurst, 1st Earl Bathurst (1684–1775), inherited the estate on the death of his father, Sir Benjamin Bathurst, in 1704. He was a Tory Member of Parliament and statesman who made his wealth from his involvement in the slave trade through the Royal Africa Company and the East India Company. From 1714 Benjamin Bathurst devoted himself to rebuilding the house formerly known as Oakley Grove, which probably stands on the site of Cirencester Castle, and laying out the parkland of what would become Oakley Park.

In 1716, Bathurst acquired the extensive estate of Sapperton from the Atkyns family, including Oakley Wood, and went on to plant one of the finest landscape gardens in England, complete with park buildings, walks, seats, grottoes and ruins. They include Alfred's Hall, now taken to be the earliest recorded Gothick garden building in England, which is also a grade II* listed building.

Allen Bathurst was raised to the peerage as a baron in 1711 and an earl in 1772, and was a patron of art and literature no less than a statesman. The poet Alexander Pope was a frequent visitor to Cirencester House; he advised on the lay-out of the gardens and designed the building known as Pope's Seat in the park, which commands a splendid view of woods and avenues. Jonathan Swift was another appreciative visitor.

The house contains portraits by Lawrence, Gainsborough, Romney, Lely, Reynolds, Hoppner, Kneller and many others, and a set of giant marble columns carrying busts, which are genuine antiques, collected in Italy by Lord Apsley, the son of the third earl, at the time of the Congress of Vienna in 1814.

There were additions to the house by Sir Robert Smirke about 1830.

Subsequent earls were patrons of the Arts and Crafts movement, when Ernest Gimson and the Barnsley brothers, Sidney and Ernest, settled at Pinbury Park on the Cirencester estate in 1894. Norman Jewson joined them in 1907, and describes his life as a student of Gimson in Sapperton in his classic memoir, By Chance I did Rove (1952).

The estate includes much of the villages of Sapperton and Coates, including Pinbury Park, and lays claim to containing the principal source of the River Thames.

Apsley House, at Hyde Park in London, was built by the architect Robert Adam for Lord Chancellor Henry Bathurst, then known as Lord Apsley, and later the second Earl Bathurst. In 1807, the house was purchased by Richard Wellesley, 1st Marquess Wellesley, who in 1817 sold it to his brother, Arthur Wellesley, 1st Duke of Wellington who presented his portrait, today still in Cirencester House).

The house has the tallest yew hedge in Britain. The tonne of clippings produced by its annual trimming are sold to pharmaceutical companies who use extracts as a key ingredient of Docetaxel, a chemotherapy drug used to treat breast, ovarian and lung cancer.

Listed buildings and structures
Aside from the Grade I listed gardens and Grade II* listed main house, several other buildings and structures are listed on the National Heritage List for England.

Grade II*
Alfred's Hall
Hexagon
Ice House
Pope's Seat
Queen Anne's Monument

Grade II
Horse Temple
Ivy Lodge and attached farm buildings and wall
Four stone piers
Round Tower and attached wall
Shelter Shed
Square Tower
Stable range and attached mounting block
The two Horse Guard pavilions

See also
Earl Bathurst
Cirencester
Sapperton, Gloucestershire
Landscape architecture

References

Nicholas Mander, Country Houses of the Cotswolds (Aurum Press, 2008)

External links
 Cirencester Park entry from The DiCamillo Companion to British & Irish Country Houses

Bathurst family
Cirencester
Country houses in Gloucestershire
Grade I listed parks and gardens in Gloucestershire
Grade II* listed buildings in Gloucestershire
Grade II* listed houses
Parks and open spaces in Gloucestershire